Patriarcha, or The Natural Power of Kings is a 1680 book by the English philosopher Robert Filmer, defending the divine right of kings on the basis that all modern states' authority derived from the Biblical patriarchs (whom he saw as Adam's heirs), history and logic. Concurrently, he criticized rival theories claiming the basis of a state should be the consent of the governed or social contract.

Reception
John Locke and others attacked what they saw as the absurdity of Filmer's views. The first of Locke's Two Treatises of Government consists mainly of criticism of Filmer. Locke found Filmer's account of political authority unworkable, arguing that it could not be used to justify any actual political authority, since it is impossible to show that any particular ruler is one of Adam's heirs.

Patriarcha remains Filmer's best known work. R. S. Downie considers Filmer's attacks on contract and consent as explanations of political obligation to be plausible, and finds it unfortunate that Filmer's belief in Adam's kingship has obscured them.

References

Bibliography
Books

 
 

1680 books
Books in political philosophy
English-language books
Christianity and political ideologies
Books about sovereignty
Works about monarchy